Chapman is an unincorporated community in Butler County, Alabama, United States. Chapman has a post office with ZIP code 36015.

History
Chapman is located on the former Louisville and Nashville Railroad and was founded as a lumber town. It was the headquarters of the W. T. Smith Lumber Company, one of the oldest lumber firms in Alabama. At one point, Chapman contained three sawmills, a veneer mill, a box factory, two barrel factories, and forty-four company houses. The W. T. Smith Company sponsored baseball teams for both white and black workers. Uniforms were provided for both teams, and they were given two-week vacations to play in summer baseball tournaments.

Demographics

References

Unincorporated communities in Butler County, Alabama
Unincorporated communities in Alabama